Simon Koros Arusei (born 4 November 1977, in Eldoret) is a Kenyan long-distance runner.

At the 2006 World Cross Country Championships he finished tenth in the long race. The Kenyan team, of which Arusei was a part, won the team competition.

Personal bests
3000 metres - 7:57.88 min (2006)
5000 metres - 13:22.76 min (2006)
10,000 metres - 27:22.01 min (2006)

References

External links

 Pace Sports Management (Internet Archive)

1977 births
Living people
People from Uasin Gishu County
Kenyan male long-distance runners
Kenyan male cross country runners
20th-century Kenyan people
21st-century Kenyan people